Tracking the Wild is a social media platform built specifically for wildlife. The platform has a two-pronged approach. On the one hand, it is a social media tool to share wildlife sightings and provide a host of reserve specific information. On the other hand, the platform embraces crowdsourcing and citizen science to generate valuable wildlife sightings data for conservation research.

History
Development of Tracking the Wild started in Cape Town in early 2012 by husband and wife team John and Natalie White. The company officially launched in February 2014 with their website and Android app followed by the launch of their iPhone app in September 2014.

In April 2017 John & Natalie starting working on a new platform Chirp Birding, a social network designed specifically for the global birding community.

Participation
The Tracking the Wild platform is based on the crowdsourcing of valuable wildlife sightings by citizen science. Tracking the Wild users submit their wildlife sightings in the form of images and/or video together with a sighting's date and time, GPS location and species name. This open data is then incorporated into an online database and shared with wildlife researchers at the University of Cape Town’s Animal Demography Unit and other accredited conservation organisations.

Protection of Endangered Species
The platform has been built to exclude rhino sightings and restrict the location information for any species whose safety could be jeopardised by its location being made public. This can be managed on a park-by-park and individual species basis.

Protected Areas Covered
The Tracking the Wild platform currently covers over 40 national parks, nature reserves and game reserves across South Africa, Botswana, Namibia, Swaziland and Zimbabwe.

External links
 
 Tracking the Wild's Android App
 Tracking the Wild's iPhone App

References

Citizen science
Social media companies
Internet properties established in 2012